Nelson Island (historical names Leipzig Island, O'Cain's Island and Strachans Island) is an island  long and  wide, lying southwest of King George Island in the South Shetland Islands, Antarctica. The name Nelson Island dates back to at least 1821 and is now established in international usage.

Eco-Nelson Station
Formerly private research station Eco-Nelson is located on Nelson Island,  which is one of the South Shetland Islands. The station was founded in 1988 by the Czech polar explorer Jaroslav Pavlíček. Since 2017 the installation was devoted to the Czech Antarctic Foundation (https://www.antarcticfoundation.cz/en/) and from 2018 the operator is the Czech Antarctic Research Programme (https://carp.sci.muni.cz/) based at Masaryk University (https://www.muni.cz/en). Until the planned reconstruction is finished, the name of this field campsite/refuge is CZ*ECO Nelson. More info to be found here https://cs.wikipedia.org/wiki/Eco-Nelson (for now in Czech only).

See also 
 Composite Antarctic Gazetteer
 List of Antarctic and sub-Antarctic islands
 List of Antarctic islands south of 60° S
 List of Antarctic research stations
 List of Antarctic field camps
 SCAR
 Edgell Bay
 Spiro Hill
 Territorial claims in Antarctica

References

External links 
Chart of South Shetland including Coronation Island, &c. from the exploration of the sloop Dove in the years 1821 and 1822 by George Powell Commander of the same. Scale ca. 1:200000. London: Laurie, 1822.

Islands of the South Shetland Islands